Mak-guksu or buckwheat noodles is a Korean buckwheat noodle dish served in a chilled broth and sometimes with sugar, mustard, sesame oil or vinegar. It is a local specialty of the Gangwon province of South Korea, and its capital city, Chuncheon. Jaengban-guksu is a type of makguksu in which buckwheat noodles and various vegetables are mixed in a tray.

Ingredients and preparation 
Makguksu is closely related to naengmyeon, the archetypal Korean cold noodle dish. However, its differences lie in the high concentration of buckwheat flour in its noodles — the result of the grain being a staple crop in the Gangwon-do area, and the use of greater amounts of vegetables. The dish gets its name "rough noodles" because the buckwheat used is generally unhulled.

Makguksu is usually prepared directly from buckwheat crop, soaked, and ground into a paste. Since buckwheat is less glutinous than most grains, buckwheat flour is particularly difficult to knead, roll, and slice into noodles by hand; thus, the noodles are often created in a hand-cranked noodle-making machine instead.

It is difficult to generalise regarding makguksu's accompanying ingredients. Ingredients are traditionally determined by the customer rather than the restaurant owner, and many restaurants also carry their own unique flavouring recipes. In most cases, makguksu is very spicy, sometimes seasoned with gochujang (hot chile pepper paste). Various types of kimchi can be added as well: nabak kimchi, dongchimi or baechu kimchi. Many recipes also add various vegetables and/or soy sauce. Banchan (side dishes) vary in equal measure. In the Chuncheon area, the dish is frequently accompanied by boiled beef or pork; elsewhere, it may be served with bindaetteok (mung bean pancakes) or gamjajeon (potato pancakes).

Chuncheon 
Makguksu has become a large part of the identity of the Chuncheon region. In recent decades, a "buckwheat noodle street" featuring more than a dozen makguksu restaurants has developed in the downtown area. There is a makguksu museum, and the city also hosts the annual Chuncheon Makguksu Noodle Festival, featuring makguksu tastings and other celebrations.

See also 
 Korean cuisine
 Dak-galbi
 Chuncheon
 List of buckwheat dishes

References

External links 

 Recipe and info of Makguksu at Korea Tourism Organization
 Makguksu museum
 Chuncheon Makguksu and Dakgalbi Festival

Buckwheat dishes
Chuncheon
Korean noodle dishes
Mixed noodles
Cold noodles